Muravyovo is a rural locality (a village) in Prilukskoye Rural Settlement, Vologodsky District, Vologda Oblast, Russia. The population was 3 as of 2002.

Geography 
Muravyovo is located 17 km northeast of Vologda (the district's administrative centre) by road. Vedrovo is the nearest rural locality.

References 

Rural localities in Vologodsky District